With a Song in My Heart is a 1952 American biographical musical drama film that tells the story of actress and singer Jane Froman, who was crippled by an airplane crash on February 22, 1943, when the Boeing 314 Pan American Clipper flying boat she was on suffered a crash landing in the Tagus River near Lisbon, Portugal. She entertained the troops in World War II despite having to walk with crutches. The film stars Susan Hayward, Rory Calhoun, David Wayne, Thelma Ritter, Robert Wagner, Helen Westcott, and Una Merkel. Froman herself supplied Hayward's singing voice.

The film was written and produced by Lamar Trotti and directed by Walter Lang. The title song, "With a Song in My Heart" (Rodgers and Hart, 1929), became famous in the United Kingdom as the theme to the long-running BBC radio show Family Favourites.

Plot
Jane Froman (Susan Hayward) is a humble staff singer at a Cincinnati radio station, but in no time she rises to the uppermost rungs of network radio fame. Jane gratefully marries her agent Don Ross (David Wayne), but soon both realize they're not truly in love. Jane's popularity soars, and she leaves on a European tour.  When her plane crashes, she is partially crippled.  Unable to walk without crutches, she nonetheless goes on to entertain U.S. troops during World War II.

Cast
 Susan Hayward as Jane Froman
 Rory Calhoun as John Burn
 David Wayne as Don Ross
 Thelma Ritter as Clancy
 Robert Wagner as GI paratrooper
 Helen Westcott as Jennifer March
 Una Merkel as Sister Marie
 Richard Allan as dancer / tenor
 Max Showalter as Harry Guild
 Ed Oliver as bandleader

Singing groups the Four Girl Friends, the Modernaires, the Melody Men, the Sklyarks, and the Starlighters appear in the film.

Production
The rights to Jane Froman's life story were sought by a variety of production companies, including MGM, Warner Bros, Sam Goldwyn, 20th Century Fox, and Wald-Krasna (at RKO). In September 1950 Fox announced that Lamar Trotti would write and produce The Jane Froman Story. Froman says she decided to go with Fox after talking to Trotti even though MGM offered $25,000 more. She says the price paid was "mid six figures".

In March 1951 Fox announced that the male leads would be played by David Wayne and Dale Robertson and that the film would be called I'll See You in My Dreams.  In April 1951, Jean Peters was announced as the star. In May, the lead went to Susan Hayward.

The title was changed to You, the Night and the Music. Rory Calhoun replaced Robertson in June.

In July 1951 Robert Wagner was added to the cast.

Joyce McKenzie was cast as the woman (in reality singer and actress Tamara Drasin, who died in the crash) who took Froman's seat

Froman acted as technical adviser, but refused to watch the sequence involving the airplane crash.

Soundtrack recording
As per the times, the soundtrack album for With a Song in My Heart was a studio recording, and it initially included eight songs and a shorter version of the "American Medley" sung by Jane Froman, with a short orchestral introduction by George Greeley, who conducted the orchestra and chorus. The Capitol Records album was released in multiple formats: Capitol L-309 (LP), DDN-309 (4 record 78rpm-Box Set); KDF-309 (4 record 45rpm singles Box-Set); and FBF-309 (2 EP Box-set). This album was the best-selling album of 1952 and spent 25 weeks at the top of the Billboard chart. Jane Froman also released a single of the title song with Capitol Records.

Reception
The film was a box office success. Wagner's small role received a lot of acclaim, resulting in 3,000 fan letters a week arriving at the studio – this encouraged Fox to build him up as a star.

Awards and honors

The film was also nominated for inclusion on AFI's 100 Years...100 Cheers list of the most inspiring films in American film history, but did not make the final list.

Soundtrack songs from the film
Although the film won the Academy Award for the Best Original Score, there were a number of American standards represented. All except three songs featured the voice of Jane Froman; and were performed by Susan Hayward.

 "Dixie" – 1859 song by Daniel Decatur Emmett
 "With a Song in My Heart" – Music by Richard Rodgers; lyrics by Lorenz Hart
 "Hoe That Corn" – Music by Max Showalter; lyrics by Jack Woodford (performed by Max Showalter and David Wayne)
 "That Old Feeling" – Music by Sammy Fain; lyrics by Lew Brown
 "I'm Through With Love" – Music by Fud Livingston & Matty Malneck; lyrics by Gus Kahn
 "Get Happy" – Music by Harold Arlen; lyrics by Ted Koehler
 "Jim's Toasty Peanuts" – Music and lyrics by Ken Darby
 "The Right Kind" – Music by Alfred Newman; lyrics by Don George & Charles Henderson 
 "Montparnasse" – Music by Alfred Newman; lyrics by Eliot Daniel (Sung by David Wayne)
 "Blue Moon" – Music by Richard Rodgers; lyrics by Lorenz Hart
 "On the Gay White Way" – Music by Ralph Rainger; lyrics by Leo Robin
 "Home on the Range" – Music by Daniel E. Kelley; lyrics by Brewster M. Higley
 "Embraceable You" – Music by George Gershwin; lyrics by Ira Gershwin
 "Tea for Two" – Music by Vincent Youmans; lyrics by Irving Caesar
 "It's a Good Day" – Music and lyrics by Peggy Lee and Dave Barbour
 "They're Either Too Young or Too Old" – Music by Arthur Schwartz; lyrics by Frank Loesser
 "I'll Walk Alone" – Music by Jules Styne; lyrics by Sammy Cahn
Songs included in an "American Medley"
 "America the Beautiful" – Music by Samuel A. Ward; lyrics by Katharine Lee Bates
 "Wonderful Home Sweet Home" – Music and lyrics by Ken Darby
 "Give My Regards to Broadway" – Music and lyrics by George M. Cohan
 "Chicago" – Music and lyrics by Fred Fisher
 "California Here I Come" – Music by Joseph Mayer; lyrics by Al Jolson & Buddy G. DeSylva
 "Carry Me Back to Old Virginny" – Music and lyrics by James A. Bland
 "Stein Song" (University of Maine)" – Music and lyrics by E.A. Fenstad & Lincoln Colcord
 "Back Home Again in Indiana" – Music by James F. Hanley; lyrics by Ballard MacDonald
 "Alabamy Bound" – Music by Ray Henderson; lyrics by Bud Green & Buddy G. DeSylva
 "Deep in the Heart of Texas" – Music by Don Swander; lyrics by June Hershey

References

External links
 
 
 
 

1952 films
1952 drama films
1952 musical films
1950s biographical drama films
1950s English-language films
1950s musical drama films
20th Century Fox films
American aviation films
American biographical drama films
American musical drama films
Best Musical or Comedy Picture Golden Globe winners
Biographical films about singers
Cultural depictions of American women
Cultural depictions of pop musicians
Films directed by Walter Lang
Films featuring a Best Musical or Comedy Actress Golden Globe winning performance
Films scored by Alfred Newman
Films that won the Best Original Score Academy Award
Films with screenplays by Lamar Trotti
Jukebox musical films
Musical films based on actual events
Photoplay Awards film of the year winners
1950s American films